In enzymology, a glycerophospholipid acyltransferase (CoA-dependent) is an enzyme that catalyzes the chemical reaction

1-organyl-2-acyl-sn-glycero-3-phosphocholine + 1-organyl-2-lyso-sn-glycero-3-phosphoethanolamine  1-organyl-2-acyl-sn-glycero-3-phosphoethanolamine + 1-organyl-2-lyso-sn-glycero-3-phosphocholine

Thus, the two substrates of this enzyme are 1-organyl-2-acyl-sn-glycero-3-phosphocholine and 1-organyl-2-lyso-sn-glycero-3-phosphoethanolamine, whereas its two products are 1-organyl-2-acyl-sn-glycero-3-phosphoethanolamine and 1-organyl-2-lyso-sn-glycero-3-phosphocholine.

This enzyme belongs to the family of transferases, specifically those acyltransferases transferring groups other than aminoacyl groups.  The systematic name of this enzyme class is 1-organyl-2-acyl-sn-glycero-3-phosphocholine:1-organyl-2-lyso-sn-gly cero-3-phosphoethanolamine acyltransferase (CoA-dependent).

References

 
 
 

EC 2.3.1
Enzymes of unknown structure